Illinois Route 25 (IL 25) is a state route in northeast Illinois. It runs north from U.S. Route 34 in Oswego to Illinois Route 62 (Algonquin Road) in Algonquin.

Route description

Illinois Route 25 was opened in August 1929; it originally ran from Elgin to East Dundee. It was extended southward to St. Charles in 1930. The entirety of this road follows part of the Fox River on its  eastern bank. Illinois Route 31 parallels Route 25 (and the river) on the western bank of the river.

Route 25's southern terminus is in Oswego. It moves northward into Montgomery, where U.S. Highway 30 passes over, but does not have an interchange with it.  Route 25 then passes through downtown Aurora.  It then winds through North Aurora and Batavia, lacking an interchange with Interstate 88.  Route 25 intersects Illinois Route 56 in North Aurora, Illinois Route 38 in Geneva, and Illinois Route 64 in St. Charles.

Route 25 continues northward through South Elgin and into Elgin, intersecting with U.S. Highway 20, and forming the western terminus of both Illinois Route 19 and Illinois Route 58 there.

North of Elgin, Route 25 intersects Interstate 90 and continues into East Dundee, crossing State Routes 72, the main east–west route through the Dundee area, and 68 near its western end.  After this, the road passes through Carpentersville, and finally ends at Illinois Route 62 in Algonquin. Route 25 is also known as J.F. Kennedy Memorial Drive within Carpentersville's boundaries.

History
SBI Route 25 was originally what is now U.S. Route 45 from Fairfield north to Kankakee. In 1935, IL 25 moved entirely from US 45 to its current routing.

Major intersections
IDOT has surveyed the route from north to south. Mileposts are given in distances from southern terminus, while mileage under county names reflects IDOT surveying.

References

External links

Illinois Highway Ends: Illinois Route 25

025
Transportation in Cook County, Illinois
Transportation in Kane County, Illinois
Transportation in Kendall County, Illinois
Algonquin, Illinois
Elgin, Illinois
St. Charles, Illinois
Geneva, Illinois
Oswego, Illinois
U.S. Route 45